British Drummer was a  tanker built in 1945 as Empire Ensign by J L Thompson & Son Ltd, Sunderland, Co Durham, United Kingdom for the Ministry of War Transport (MoWT). She was sold into merchant service in 1947 and renamed British Drummer. A sale to Norway in 1957 saw her renamed Anella. In 1958, a further sale saw her renamed Norse Commander. In September 1966, she developed boiler defects that were deemed uneconomic to repair, and she was scrapped in November that year.

Description
The ship was built in 1945 by J L Thompson & Son Ltd, Sunderland, Co Durham. She was yard number 120.

History
Empire Ensign was built for the MoWT. She was placed under the management of the British Tanker Co Ltd, London. The United Kingdom Official Number 180152 was allocated. Her Code Letters were GDMS.

Empire Ensign made her maiden voyage on 3 April 1945, when she departed from Sunderland, Co Durham to join Convoy FS 1775, which had departed from Methil, Fife that day and arrived at Southend, Essex on 5 April. On 7 April, she joined Convoy OS 121 KM, which had departed from the Clyde that day and split at sea on 14 April. Empire Ensign was in the part of the convoy which formed Convoy KMS 96G and arrived at Gibraltar on 16 April. She departed from Gibraltar on 20 April for Bizerta, Algeria, where she arrived three days later. She sailed on 25 April for Piraeus, Greece, where she arrived on 28 April. On 2 May, she sailed for Port Said, Egypt, arriving two days later. She then sailed to Suez, from  where she departed on 7 May for Aden.

Empire Ensign arrived at Aden on 12 May. She then sailed to Colombo, Ceylon, from where she departed on 20 May for Calcutta, India, arriving on 25 May. A round trip was made to Madras, arriving back at Calcutta on 10 June before sailing for Madras on 15 June. She arrived at Madras three days later and departed for Chittagong on 21 June, arriving on 24 June. Empire Ensign sailed on 1 July for Madras, arriving five days later and departing that day for the Park Strait, from where she sailed on 9 July for Calcutta, arriving four days later. She sailed on 23 July for Colombo, arriving on 22 August and sailing two days later for Vizag, India, where she arrived on 3 September. She sailed the next day for Madras, arriving two days later. Empire Ensign departed on 1 October for Port Swettenham, Malaya, arriving on 15 October. She sailed on 3 November for Singapore, arriving the next day.

In 1947, Empire Ensign was sold to the British Tanker Co Ltd, London and was renamed British Drummer. On 28 May 1947, British Drummer was in port at Haifa, Palestine being loaded with benzine when there was an attack aimed at two water tanks, which the attackers may have thought contained fuel. In 1956, she was sold to BP Tankers Ltd, London.

In 1957, British Drummer was sold to Rederi A/S Mimer & A/S Norfart, Oslo, Norway. She was renamed Anella and placed under the management of Arne Blystad, Oslo. In 1958, Anella was sold to Bucha, Godager & Co, Oslo and renamed Norse Commander. In 1959, she was chartered to Esso for use between Fawley Refinery, Hampshire, United Kingdom and Mode Wheel Locks on the Manchester Ship Canal. In 1961, she was carrying fish oil from Iceland. On 9 September 1965, Norse Commander caught fire whilst under repair in a drydock at the Albert Dock, Tanjong Pagar, Singapore. The fire was quickly extinguished and little damage was done. A reporter and cameraman from The Straits Times were refused access to the dock by the Singapore Port Authority, which claimed that the reporter "might interfere with the firefighting operation, speak to the wrong people and write the wrong report". The port authority later handed out an official press release. The Straits Times commented in an editorial that the ban of its reporter was "censorship of the very worst kind, bureaucracy in its stupidest mood". In 1966, Norse Commander suffered boiler defects. She arrived under tow at Singapore on 6 September. Repairs were deemed to be uneconomic, and she was sold to the Hong Huat Hardware Co, Singapore for scrapping. She arrived at their yard on 12 November 1966.

References

External links
Photo of Anella
Photo of Norse Commander

1944 ships
Ships built on the River Wear
Empire ships
Ministry of War Transport ships
Steamships of the United Kingdom
Tankers of the United Kingdom
Steamships of Norway
Tankers of Norway